Paul Mooney (November 4, 1904 – presumed dead after March 24, 1939) was a freelance journalist and photojournalist today best known for his collaborative work with adventurer and travel writer Richard Halliburton.

Early life
Born in Washington, D.C., on November 4, 1904, Mooney was the son of Ione Lee Gaut Mooney (died 1955), an important figure in the Daughters of the American Revolution, and James Mooney, an ethnologist for the Smithsonian Institution and an expert on American Indian lore such as the Ghost Dance.

In 1923 or 1924, Mooney boarded a freighter bound for Salonika and Constantinople. The Ottoman Empire had recently collapsed and Mustafa Kemal Atatürk was emerging as the leader of the secular Republic of Turkey. Returning to the United States, Mooney considered school at Catholic University before seeking his fortune in New York City where he wrote advertising copy for a travel agency. In 1927, he published "Seven Poems" verses which, according to his biographer Gerry Max, "speak of adventure, unrequited love, triumphant love, carnal love, death and burial." The following year he lived briefly in Paris; he also sojourned in a community in Brittany, and visited Berlin, Germany.

Attractive, fun-loving and personally engaging, Mooney, though aloof by nature and often temperamental, made friends easily; these included, besides the artists Leslie Powell and Don Forbes, writer and raconteur Eugene MacCown (who, besides a famous portrait of shipping heiress Nancy Cunard, painted a portrait of Paul), and possibly writer René Crevel. Like his father an ardent Irish patriot, he sought out writer James Joyce and others of the expatriate Irish community living in Paris.

Life in Los Angeles
About 1929, Mooney established himself in the Los Angeles area. Soon to become a fixture among the new wave of aviation promoters and fliers, he mingled with oilman Erle Halliburton, actor Ramon Novarro, aviator Moye W. Stephens, and aviator Florence "Pancho" Barnes. Also befriending him was Harry Hay, later a gay activist, with whom he argued politics and human rights issues.

About 1930, Mooney met travel writer Richard Halliburton, author of the best-selling The Royal Road to Romance (1925), The Glorious Adventure (1927) and New Worlds To Conquer (1929). The last, and most gifted, in a line of secretaries Halliburton had taken on over his career, Mooney most notably assisted him in preparing for publication The Flying Carpet (1932), Seven League Boots (1935)—these are among the last great road narratives of the classic travel book era—and the two Books of Marvels, arguably the two most influential young adult travel books ever written (The Occident [1937]; The Orient [1938]). Independently, Mooney assisted ex-Nazi Kurt Ludecke in writing the 833-page I Knew Hitler (1937), an early study of the Fuehrer and "a masterpiece of political self-vindication".

In 1937, when Halliburton decided to settle down in Laguna Beach, California, Mooney suggested to him that he contract William Alexander Levy, a recent graduate of the New York University School of Architecture, to design and build a house for him. Called Hangover House because it stood on a ridge some six hundred feet above the Pacific Ocean and precipitously overlooked Aliso Canyon, Mooney managed its construction. Of concrete and steel, the innovative house included such features as a dumbwaiter, heatilator, and a bastion-like retaining wall. Today architectural historians consider it among the early masterpieces of modern residential housing design in Southern California.

Sea Dragon Expedition
In 1938, Mooney, as his mimeograph operator, accompanied Halliburton to China on his final expedition: they planned to sail a Wenchow-styled Chinese junk christened the Sea Dragon across the Pacific from Hong Kong to the Golden Gate International Exposition in San Francisco. The Letters From The Sea Dragon, written with Halliburton (who alone signed them), offer eye-witness reports of the expanding Japanese presence in the Pacific. Sent to subscribers whose subscription fees helped finance the Sea Dragon Expedition, only four of a projected seven of these letters were written. Mooney also assisted Halliburton in preparing for the San Francisco News and the Bell Syndicate the more generally circulated articles, a projected fifteen in number, which were called collectively The Log of the Sea Dragon.

The Sea Dragon sailed eastward on March 4, 1939. Nine hundred miles southeast of Yokohama, on March 23, 1939, the ship headed into a typhoon.  Neither the ship nor its crew was ever seen again. Efforts by the SS President Coolidge and, later, the US Navy to discover the Sea Dragon met with failure.

See also
List of people who disappeared mysteriously at sea

References

1904 births
1930s missing person cases
1939 deaths
20th-century American male writers
20th-century American non-fiction writers
20th-century American journalists
20th-century LGBT people
American male journalists
American travel writers
American LGBT writers
Missing person cases in Japan
People lost at sea